NEX is a private Panamanian broadcaster based in Panama City. It broadcasts in Panama City on analog UHF channel 21 and channel 49 in DVB-T, with several repeaters across Panama. It is owned by Compañía Digital de TV.

History

RCM Television was bought by Ricardo Francolini and former Panamanian president Ricardo Martinelli in September 2012 and renamed the channel to NEXtv.

Programming
Programming consists of domestically produced variety programs, newscasts, nightly political talk shows, along with telenovelas and television series mostly from Colombia.

Sister Stations
 Viva Canal 33 (television station, religious programming)
 Más 23 TV (television station, music videos)
 KW Continente 95.9 FM (partner FM radio station, broadcasts from Nextv facilities)

References

Television stations in Panama
Television channels and stations established in 2000